Paulos is a name which can serve as a given name and as a surname.

People with the given name
Paulos Faraj Rahho (1942–2008), Iraqi archbishop
Paulos Gregorios, born Paul Varghese or Vargīsa Pôla (1922–1996), Malankara Orthodox Syrian Church bishop
Paulos Mantovanis (1945–2011), Eastern Orthodox metropolitan bishop of Kyrenia, Cyprus
Paulos Tesfagiorgis, Eritrean human rights activist
Paulos Tzadua (1921–2003), Ethiopian Cardinal

People with the surname
Abune Paulos (1935–2012), Patriarch of the Ethiopian Orthodox Tewahedo Church
Eric Paulos (born 1969), American computer scientist and roboticist
John Allen Paulos (born 1945), American professor of mathematics
Shimun XX Paulos (1885–1920), Catholicos Patriarch of the Assyrian Church of the East
Nick Paulos (born 1992), Greek-American basketball player

See also

Dairo Paulos, a village in Eritrea

References